Saint-Victor-et-Melvieu (Languedocien: Sant Victor e Malviu) is a commune in the Aveyron department in southern France.

Geography

Generalities 
The communal territory, which extends for 17.91 km^2, is constituted of landscapes of avant-causses, characterized by hills.

The minimal altitude, with 262 meters, is localized at the extreme west, near the place called the May d'Entraygues, where the Tarn leaves the commune and enters that of Le Truel. The maximal altitude with 689 or 694 meters is a kilometer and a half to the northwest of the village of Saint-Victor, at the Puech de Luargues.

Hydrography

Hydrographic network 

The commune is drained by the Tarn, the stream of Geneve, the stream of the Valade, a branch of the Tarn, the stream of Pourquairol, the stream of Ricardel, and by several small courses of water.

The Lac de Pinet completes the hydrographic network. It is related to a very wild lake on its part downstream, of a maximum depth of 25 meters and a superficial one of 130 ha. It is open to fishing at the upstream part up to Mas de Lanauq. It is in the territories and communes of Saint-Rome-de-Tarn, Saint-Victor-et-Melvieu, and Viala-du-Tarn.

Management of courses of water 
Administration of courses of water in the Aveyron basin is assured by the  Aveyron upstream, created on 1 January 2017, replacing the mixed syndicate of basin slope Aveyron upstream.

Population

See also
Communes of the Aveyron department

Notes

References

Communes of Aveyron
Aveyron communes articles needing translation from French Wikipedia